Sio Sam Ong (小三王), literally meaning "Three Little Kings", or SSO, for short, is a leading Chinese triad in Malaysia; with a strong presence in the north (i.e. Kedah, Perlis). Mainly based in Penang, it is widely considered to be one of the most powerful triads in the country. Like their counterparts in Singapore and Taiwan, the Sio Sam Ong mostly consists of the Hokkien ethnic group.

Background 

It is believed that Sio Sam Ong was established during the 1940s to 1950s; being mainly active in northern Malaysia. According to the Malaysian police, Sio Sam Ong is currently one of the most active triads after Aek En Sang, Ang Soon Toong, Salakau Singapore, Ghee Heng, Ang Bin Hoay and Chaun San in Malaysia. it is believed that they have around 500 thousand members and involved in 100 countries. In Malaysia, they were actively involved in politics by joining the government coalition (Barisan Nasional) parties United Malays National Organisation (UMNO) and the Malaysian Chinese Association (MCA) to cover up their identity. They use the code of 3821 gang, and 36 international brothers/ red international army according to the hoax of Chinese triads history. Its currently headed by Dragon Head, Ong King Ee, nicknamed "Jackie Chan".

According to Penang police, the triad has been involved in international drug trafficking, kidnapping, murder, extortion, racketeering and loansharking at its height.

The triad gained notoriety by the slaying of six people in Taman Bersatu, Sungai Petani, in September 1992. The members were also involved in at least 10 murders in the state in the late '80s and early '90s.

There were five members executed for betraying the triad, the remains were exhumed from unmarked graves in Mount Erskine, Penang. Many of its high-ranking members are still high on the Malaysian Police wanted list.

References

 Who Are The Triads Identified? at mynewsfocus.com

Organizations established in the 1940s
1940s establishments in British Malaya
Triad groups
Organized crime groups in Malaysia